Achyranthes mutica (also called blunt chaff flower) is a species of plant in the family Amaranthaceae. It is endemic to Hawaii. Its natural habitats are dry forests and subtropical or tropical dry shrubland. It is threatened by habitat loss.

References

Sources

External links 
 Achyranthes mutica information from the Hawaiian Ecosystems at Risk project (HEAR)

mutica
Endemic flora of Hawaii
Critically endangered plants
Taxonomy articles created by Polbot